This is a list of all the reasons written by Louise Charron during her tenure as puisne justice of the Supreme Court of Canada.

2005

2006

2007

2008

2009

2010
{| width=100%
|-
|
{| width=100% align=center cellpadding=0 cellspacing=0
|-
! bgcolor=#CCCCCC | Statistics
|-
|

2011
{| width=100%
|-
|
{| width=100% align=center cellpadding=0 cellspacing=0
|-
! bgcolor=#CCCCCC | Statistics
|-
|

Charron